Eld Inlet is an inlet located at the southern end of Puget Sound in Thurston County, Washington. It is the second southernmost arm of Puget Sound after neighboring Budd Inlet.

Etymology
Eld Inlet was given its present name by Charles Wilkes during the United States Exploring Expedition, to honor one of the expedition's officers, Midshipman Henry Eld.

History
In May 1792 Peter Puget and Joseph Whidbey of the Vancouver Expedition explored Eld Inlet. At the southern end they found a native village of about 60 inhabitants. Due to the friendly reception Puget called the place Friendly Inlet.

Geography
McLane Creek drains into the southern end of Eld Inlet, forming a large mudflat known as Mud Bay.

See also
Totten Inlet

References

Inlets of Washington (state)
Bodies of water of Thurston County, Washington